Anguis colchica, the eastern slowworm, is a species of lizard in the family Anguidae found in eastern Europe and Asia. It is easily confused with the common slowworm, due to their physical similarities, and the proximity of their distribution.

Taxonomy
The eastern slowworm is part of the slowworm species complex. It was traditionally written as A. f. colchica, a subspecies of the common slowworm, but was later distinguished as a separate species, along with Anguis graeca, Anguis veronensis and Anguis cephalonnica.

Habitat
Eastern slowworms live primarily in areas with partially closed, forest or shrub vegetation. They can be found most often on the edges of forests, forest clearings, and sometimes on tourist trails, where they can lie down to bask in the sun. They utilise stone piles, stone fences, coarse woody debris, and even the burrows of some rodents as hiding places. They commonly venture into gardens close to their habitat.

Behaviour
Eastern slowworms are mostly crepuscular animals, but are sometimes found to be active during the daytime, especially after rain. Their diet consists of small, slow moving invertebrates such as earthworms, slugs and insect larvae. The mating season of the species is usually between the end of April, and the beginning of June. Slowworms hibernate during the winter, starting from mid-October. During this time, they settle under logs, roots, in rock crevices or in rodent passages.

References

Anguis
Reptiles described in 1840
Lizards of Europe
Lizards of Asia
Taxa named by Alexander von Nordmann
Taxobox binomials not recognized by IUCN